The UK Albums Chart is a record chart based on weekly album sales in the United Kingdom; during the 1960s, a total of 57 albums reached number one. The sources are the Melody Maker chart until March 1960, and the Record Retailer chart from March 1960 onwards.

Number ones

By artist

Six artists spent 20 weeks or more at number one on the albums chart during the 1960s.

By record label
Eight record labels spent 20 weeks or more at number one on the albums chart during the 1960s.

Notes

References

Sources

External links
Archive of all UK Number One Albums of the 1960s with images of original packaging
Official UK Albums Top 100 at the Official Charts Company

UK Albums
1960s